The 1907–08 RPI men's ice hockey season was the 5th season of play for the program.

Season
For their fifth season Rensselaer was able to play one of the Intercollegiate Hockey Association member teams for the first time when they played Dartmouth. RPI performed admirably, finishing with a tie. In the final game of their season RPI decimated local rival Union 14–2 in the last meeting between the two for over 15 years. 

Note: Rensselaer's athletic teams were unofficially known as 'Cherry and White' until 1921 when the Engineers moniker debuted for the men's basketball team.

Roster

Standings

Schedule and Results

|-
!colspan=12 style=";" | Regular Season

References

RPI Engineers men's ice hockey seasons
RPI
RPI
RPI
RPI